Hanumappa Shivraj (born 25 November 1990) is an Indian cricketer who plays for Andhra Pradesh. He made his first-class debut on 30 October in the 2015–16 Ranji Trophy.

References

External links
 

1990 births
Living people
Indian cricketers
Andhra cricketers
People from Anantapur district
Cricketers from Andhra Pradesh